The Curtis D. Menard Memorial Sports Center, originally Wasilla Multi-Use Sports Complex, is a 102,000 square foot multi-purpose arena in Wasilla, Alaska, designed to accommodate up to 5,000 people.  

The facility consists of an NHL-size ice arena, an indoor artificial turf court, a running/walking track,  three community meeting rooms, and a commercial kitchen facility.

History 
In 2002, Wasilla residents voted to add half a percentage point to their sales tax to fund construction of the $14.7 million facility.  This project was significantly delayed by an eminent domain lawsuit brought by the prior landowner, Gary Lundgren.

References

External links
 Curtis D. Menard Memorial Sports Center

American football venues in Alaska
Buildings and structures in Matanuska-Susitna Borough, Alaska
Indoor arenas in Alaska
Indoor ice hockey venues in Alaska
Indoor soccer venues in the United States
Indoor track and field venues in the United States
Soccer venues in Alaska
Wasilla, Alaska
2004 establishments in Alaska
Sports venues completed in 2004